The Casa Solariega de José de Diego, also known as the Lería Esmoris Residence, is a historic home built in 1897 and listed on the National Register of Historic Places.

History 
The house was designed by José Sabas Honoré Rivera and built by his father, Victor Honoré Garaud. The daughter of the former, Laura Honoré de Cuebas, was the author of the hymn of the University of Puerto Rico, Mayagüez Campus, which would be founded in 1911 by de Diego and she would give birth to a daughter of the same name, who would go on to teach there, in a hospital that would become the university's art museum. It was originally built for Santiago Sáenz y Martínez, who later passed it to José de Diego. de Diego resided there for some years, as he was designated prosecutor and president of the Audiencia (Criminal Court) of Mayagüez in 1899 by General Brooke and three years later was elected as the representative for the House of Delegates. Later, de Diego's only sister, Pola de Diez, lived in the residence with her husband Alejandro Lull. In 1923 it was bought by Fructuoso Lería Domínguez, later passed to his son, Dr. José Pedro Lería Esmoris, who was the then-owner when it was listed in the NRHP, and finally to his daughter Griselda Lería Santana.

Description 
The property is an urban mansion built in the "Modernist" located on a 716.82 m2 plot in the middle of a block, permitting the mansion to have a front entrance, to Liceo St., and a back entrance, facing Salud St. It is an L-shaped mansion.

Future Plans 
On 2 April 2012, the Municipality of Mayagüez expropriated the property from Natalabriel, Inc., a tire business which owns the whole block, with the intention to establish a museum in the building commemorating the University of Puerto Rico at Mayagüez, since de Diego was a cofounder of the institution.

Timeline

References 

1897 establishments in Puerto Rico
National Register of Historic Places in Mayagüez, Puerto Rico
Houses completed in 1897
University of Puerto Rico at Mayagüez
University museums in Puerto Rico
Houses on the National Register of Historic Places in Puerto Rico
University and college buildings on the National Register of Historic Places in Puerto Rico
Historic house museums in Puerto Rico